Marcos Nahuel Landáburu (born 26 August 2000) is an Argentine professional footballer who plays as a centre-forward for Club Atlético Atlas.

Career
Landáburu started his career in the youth system of San Telmo. In January 2020, Landáburu left the Primera B Metropolitana club to join Independiente of the Primera División on loan for twelve months. He initially featured for their reserves, but was moved into the first-team after the COVID-19 enforced break. After scoring a goal in pre-season against Gimnasia y Esgrima, the centre-forward made his senior debut on 15 November in a goalless draw away to Defensa y Justicia in the Copa de la Liga Profesional; he had been an unused substitute in four prior matches.

Career statistics
.

Notes

References

External links

2000 births
Living people
Footballers from Buenos Aires
Argentine footballers
Association football forwards
San Telmo footballers
Club Atlético Independiente footballers